The Merida brushfinch or Merida brush finch (Atlapetes meridae) is a species of bird in the family Passerellidae, the New World sparrows. It is endemic to northwestern Venezuela.

Taxonomy and systematics

The Handbook of the Birds of the World (HBW) and the Clements taxonomy consider the Merida brushfinch to be a subspecies of moustached brushfinch (Atlapetes albofrenatus) but note that it might be a full species. The International Ornithological Congress (IOC) has accepted it as a full species.

Description

The adult's body is olive above merging to lemon yellow below; wings and tail are olive. The head has a chestnut crown, a black mask, a white submoustacial stripe, and a yellow throat. The juvenile is duller, being olive above and dark yellow below. Its head pattern is similar to that of the adult but muted.

Distribution and habitat

The Merida brushfinch is a year-round resident of the Andes of western Venezuela, in Mérida and the eastern part of Táchira departments. It prefers humid elfin and oak-dominant forest and is a bird of dense undergrowth including ferns and bamboo within and along the borders of such forests. It also inhabits drier woodland with dense undergrowth and is tolerant of disturbed habitats.

Behavior and ecology

The Merida brushfinch feeds primarily on arthropods, fruits, and berries. It tends to forage from the ground to  up in shrubs and trees. It usually forages and travels in pairs or family groups but will also join mixed-species flocks. Though it usually remains hidden in dense vegetation, it appears to tolerate human observers.

Almost nothing is known about the Merida brushfinch's breeding biology. Its courtship, behavior at a nest, and the nest itself have not been described. Young have been seen: a juvenile bird in Perijá in August and fledglings in Mérida in May and June.

Status

Though the species has a rather restricted range, it is fairly common within it and appears to have a stable population. That and its tolerance for disturbed habitat lead the IUCN to consider it a species of least concern.

References

Atlapetes
Endemic birds of Venezuela
Birds of the Venezuelan Andes
Birds described in 1871
Taxa named by Philip Sclater
Taxa named by Osbert Salvin